According to Mary Magdalene (1997) is a novel by the Swedish novelist Marianne Fredriksson. It attempts to portray the life of the biblical figure of Mary Magdalene as told by herself. The author claims to have based the book on Gnostic manuscripts, such as the Gospel of Mary, that were discovered in recent times. The English version was published 1999.

Plot introduction
The story offers a feminist perspective on the person of Christ and on the beginnings of the Christian Church. Since it presents Jesus as merely a human being and deviates from the orthodox biblical portrayal of the Son of Man, the novel was severely criticised by mainstream Christians.

References

1997 Swedish novels
Novels by Marianne Fredriksson
Novels based on the Bible
Swedish-language novels
Novelistic portrayals of Jesus
Mary Magdalene